Marcin Dołęga (born 18 July 1982) is a Polish weightlifter. He is a three-time World champion in the 105 kg weight division.

Personal life 
Dołęga was born on 18 July 1982 in Łuków, Poland. His brothers Robert and Daniel are also weightlifters.

Career 
Dołęga broke the snatch world record in 2002 with 198 kg, and in 2006 with 199 kg.

In 2004 Dołęga was banned for two years because of doping use.

He won at the 2006 World Weightlifting Championships, with a total of 415 kg. He also won at the 2006 European Weightlifting Championships. He represented Poland at the 2008 Summer Olympics, ranking 3rd with a total of 420 kg.

He won the gold medal in the 105 kg category again at the 2009 World Weightlifting Championships, with a total of 426 kg.

Major results

References

External links 
 
 
 Marcin Dolega at Lift Up
 
 

1982 births
Living people
Polish male weightlifters
Olympic weightlifters of Poland
Weightlifters at the 2008 Summer Olympics
Weightlifters at the 2012 Summer Olympics
World Weightlifting Championships medalists
European Weightlifting Championships medalists
Polish sportspeople in doping cases
Doping cases in weightlifting
Sportspeople from Lublin Voivodeship
People from Łuków
21st-century Polish people
20th-century Polish people